Merten Mauritz (born 22 December 1965) is an Austrian fencer. He competed in the team foil event at the 1992 Summer Olympics.

References

External links
 

1965 births
Living people
Austrian male foil fencers
Olympic fencers of Austria
Fencers at the 1992 Summer Olympics
Fencers from Vienna